The list of awards and nominations Jessie J has received during her career.

ARIA Music Awards
The ARIA Music Awards is the annual Australian music awards ceremony. In 2011, Jessie J has received one nomination.

APRA Music Awards
APRA Awards are several award ceremonies run in Australia and New Zealand by Australasian Performing Right Association to recognise songwriting skills, sales and airplay performance by its members annually. Jessie J has been nominated once.

ASCAP Pop Music Awards
The American Society of Composers, Authors and Publishers (ASCAP) is a not-for-profit performance rights organisation that protects its members' musical copyrights by monitoring public performances of their music, whether via a broadcast or live performance, and compensating them accordingly.

Australian Nickelodeon Kid's Choice Awards
The Nickelodeon Australian Kids' Choice Awards is an annual awards show which awards entertainers with a blimp trophy, as voted by kids. Jessie J has received one nomination in 2011.

BBC Radio 1Xtra Hot Summer Awards 

!Ref.
|-
| 2013
| "Excuse My Rude"
| Hottest Guest
| 
|

Billboard Women in Music 
Established in 2007, Billboard Woman of the Year is presented annually at Billboard Women in Music, and honours female contributions to the business, and leadership in embracing the changing music. Other awards to female artists are presented during the ceremony.

|-
!scope="row"| 2014
| Jessie J
| Powerhouse
| 
|}

BMI Awards

BMI London Music Awards

|-
!scope="row"| 2016
| Bang Bang ( feat. Nicki Minaj & Ariana Grande)
| Award Winning Songs
| 
|}

Brit Awards
The Brit Awards are the British Phonographic Industry's (BPI) annual pop music awards. Jessie J has received one award from seven nominations.

BT Digital Music Awards
The BT Digital Music Awards are held annually in the United Kingdom. Jessie J has won three awards from four nominations.

Glamour Awards
Glamour Awards are an awards show held annually in the UK to reward the most successful women in show business. Jessie has received one award nomination.

Grammy Awards
The Grammy Awards are awarded annually by the National Academy of Recording Arts and Sciences of the United States. Jessie J received one nomination.

IARA Awards

iHeartRadio Music Awards 
The iHeartRadio Music Awards is an international music awards show founded by iHeartRadio in 2014.

Ibiza Music Video Festival
Ibiza Music Video Festival is the online music video competition. Rupert Bryan and Elizabeth Fear founded the event in 2013.

|-
| 2017
| "Can't Take My Eyes Off You"
| Best Hair & Make-Up
|

International Dance Music Awards
The International Dance Music Awards is an awards event held annually in Miami, Florida, and was established in 1985 by Winter Music Conference (WMC) to recognise and honour exceptional achievements.

Kids' Choice Awards

MOBO Awards
The MOBO Awards (Music of Black Origin) first held in 1996, are held annually in the United Kingdom to recognise artists of any race or nationality who perform black music and showcase "the world of urban music including R&B, hip-hop, gospel and reggae as a potent force in the cultural worldwide music community". Jessie J has won five awards from six nominations.

MTV

MTV Brand New
MTV's Brand New are an annual awards by MTV for the very best in new music.

 Jessie J came second place.

MTV Europe Music Awards
The MTV Europe Music Awards were established in 1994 by MTV Europe to celebrate the most popular music videos in Europe.

MTV Video Music Awards
The MTV Video Music Awards The MTV Video Music Awards was established in 1984 by MTV to award the music videos of the year.

MTV Video Play Awards
The MTV Video Play Awards are an annual event celebrates the highest video play counts on MTV channels across the globe.

NewNowNext Awards
The NewNowNext Awards are an annual LGBT-awards show, held by Logo.

NRJ Music Awards
The NRJ Music Awards, by the radio station NRJ in partnership with the television network TF1 takes place every year in mid-January at Cannes (PACA, France) as the opening of MIDEM.

People's Choice Awards

Popjustice Twenty Quid Music Prize
The Popjustice £20 Music Prize is an annual prize awarded by a panel of judges organised by music website Popjustice to the singer(s) of the best British pop single of the past year.

Q Awards
The Q Awards are the UK's annual music awards run by the music magazine Q to honour musical excellence. Winners are voted by readers of Q online, with others decided by a judging panel. Jessie has received one award from three nominations.

Silver Clef Awards

The Silver Clef Awards is an annual UK music awards lunch, which has been running since 1976.

Sound of... 
Sound of... is an annual BBC poll of music critics and industry figures to find the most promising new music talent.

Stonewall Awards
The Stonewall Awards is an annual event that celebrates the contribution that individuals and organisations make to the lives of lesbian, gay and bisexual people in Britain today. It was first held in 2006.

UK Festival Awards
The UK Festival Awards are an award show that recognises the best music festivals in the UK. Jessie has received two nominations in 2011.

UK Music Video Awards
The UK Music Video Awards are the British version of the MTV Video Music Awards. Jessie has received 6 nominations.

Urban Music Awards
The Urban Music Awards is a British awards ceremony launched in 2003 to recognise the achievement of urban-based artists, producers, nightclubs, DJs, radio stations, and record labels. Jessie J has received one award from four nominations.

World Music Awards
The World Music Awards is an international awards show founded in 1989 that honours recording artists based on their worldwide sales figures, which are provided by the International Federation of the Phonographic Industry.

References

Jessie J
Awards and nominations